The Brown Journal of World Affairs is a biannual academic journal of international relations and foreign policy produced at Watson Institute for International and Public Affairs at Brown University. It was founded in 1993 as the Brown Journal of Foreign Affairs by Daniel Cruise, Alex Scribner, and Michael Soussan. The journal features essays written by world leaders, policymakers, and prominent academics. Each issue is composed of three thematic sections dedicated to exploring different topics in contemporary international politics and economics. In addition, each issue includes an open essay section, in which a wide variety of global issues are discussed. 

The Journal is funded in part by the Watson Institute for International and Public Affairs and Brown's Finance Board.

Notable contributors

Editors-in-Chief
The Journal is led by two coeditors-in-chief, who typically serve one year terms.
 Daniel Cruise 1994
 Alexander Scribner 1994
 Michael Soussan 1995
 Pier Smulders 1995
 Spyros Demetriou 1996, Project Director of the United Nations Development Programme
 J. Peter Scoblic 1997, Executive Editor of The New Republic
 Andrew Lowenstein
 Michael J. Hsu 1997
 Tarek E. Masoud 1997
 Douglas McGray 1997
 Jeffrey W. Dillon 1999
 Shalinee Sharma 1999
 Elizabeth Foz 2000
 Madeleine Kokx 2000
 Charlene Lat 2001
 James Fichter 2001
 Patrick O'Brien 2002
 Jennifer Schwartzman 2002
 Jaideep Singh 2003
 Daniel Widome 2003
 Andrew Horesh 2004
 Keith Stanski 2004
 Jesse Finkelstein 2005
 Priya Bindra 2005
 Barron YoungSmith 2006
 Seema Vora 2006
 Jillian Moo-Young 2006
 Kenta Tsuda 2007
 Katherine Reisner 2007
 Craig Kennedy 2008
 Shiyin Wang 2008
 Solomon Eppel 2010
 Tushar Khadloya 2010
 Anagha Prasad 2010
 Harvey Stephenson 2011
 Anthony Badami 2011
 Melanie Garunay 2011
 Sam Magaram 2012
 Mustafa Safdar 2012
 Kathy Nguyen 2013
 Cameron Parsons 2013
 Reva Dhingra 2014
 Maxwell Ernst 2014
 Carol Kim 2015
 Sabin Ray 2015
 Katherine Pollock 2016
 Lily Halpern 2016
Tomas Navia 2016
Pranav Sharma 2017
Asya Igmen 2017
Paul Butler 2018
Luiza Osorio G. da Silva 2018
Oliver Hermann 2019
Jacquelyn S. Ingrassia 2019
 Isabel Alexiades 2020
 Jonah Shrock 2020
 Rakhi Kundra 2021
 Olivia Siemens 2021
 Caroline Allen 2022
 Kamran King 2022
 Isabella Yepes 2023
 Erik Brown 2023

In popular culture
Actor Donald Sutherland appeared holding a copy of the Brown Journal of World Affairs on an episode of the ABC television drama Commander in Chief.

References

External links
 Brown Journal of World Affairs
 Brown Journal of World Affairs Archives
 Brown Journal of World Affairs archive at JSTOR
 "Macho Policy Geeks", a Brown Alumni Magazine profile of The Brown Journal of World Affairs

Magazines established in 1993
Political magazines published in the United States
Brown University organizations
Biannual magazines published in the United States
Academic journals edited by students
Magazines published in Rhode Island
Mass media in Providence, Rhode Island
Student magazines published in the United States